Jack Johnson is a 1970 American documentary film directed by Jimmy Jacobs about the American boxer Jack Johnson (1878–1946). It was nominated for an Academy Award for Best Documentary Feature. Cayton asked jazz artist Miles Davis to record music for the documentary, which resulted in Davis' 1971 album of the same name.

Production
Johnson had been the subject of the 1967 play The Great White Hope written by Howard Sackler which was later adapted into a 1970 film. Jacobs and Clayton had previously collaborated on boxing documentaries Legendary Champions (1968) and A.k.a. Cassius Clay (1970).

See also
 List of American films of 1970

References

External links

1970 films
1970 documentary films
1970s English-language films
American sports documentary films
American black-and-white films
Documentary films about boxing
Documentary films about sportspeople
Films directed by Jimmy Jacobs (handballer)
Films scored by Miles Davis
1970s American films